The Mongolian People's Republic (BNMAU) was a socialist state which existed from 1924 to 1992, located in the historical region of Outer Mongolia in East Asia. It was ruled by the Mongolian People's Revolutionary Party and maintained close links with the Soviet Union throughout its history.
Geographically, it was bordered by China to its south and the Soviet Union (via the Russian SFSR) to its north. Until 1944, it also bordered the Tuvan People's Republic, a Soviet satellite state recognized only by Mongolia and the Soviet Union.

History

Formation 

From 1758 to 1911, the Mongols were ruled by the Manchu Qing dynasty. In the first decade of the 20th century, the Qing government began implementing the so-called New Policies, aimed at a further integration of Outer Mongolia. Upset by the prospect of the colonization akin to the developments in Inner Mongolia during the 19th century, the Mongolian aristocracy turned to the Russian Empire for support. In August 1911, a Mongol delegation went to Saint Petersburg and obtained a pledge of limited support. When they returned, the Xinhai Revolution—which eventually led to the collapse of the Qing dynasty—had begun. In December 1911 the Mongols deposed the Qing Amban in Ulaanbaatar and declared their independence under the leadership of the 8th Jebtsundamba Khutuktu, who was appointed Bogd Khan of Mongolia, breaking away from the Qing dynasty. Attempts to include Inner Mongolia into the new state failed for various reasons, including the military weakness of the Inner Mongols to achieve their independence, the lack of Russian assistance to them (Russia was bound in Inner Mongolian affairs by secret treaties with Japan), and the lack of support from Inner Mongolian aristocrats and the higher clergy. In the Khiagt agreement of 1915, China, Russia and Mongolia agreed on Mongolia's status as maintaining autonomy under Chinese suzerainty.

However, the Republic of China was able to use the Russian Revolution and the ensuing civil war as a pretext to deploy troops in Outer Mongolia, and in 1919 the Mongolian government was forced to sign a treaty that abolished Mongolia's autonomy. According to an Associated Press dispatch, some Mongol chieftains signed a petition asking China to retake administration of Mongolia and end Outer Mongolia's autonomy. The Tusiyetu Khan Aimak's Prince Darchin Ch'in Wang was a supporter of Chinese rule while his younger brother Tsewang was a supporter of the Russian warlord Ungern-Sternberg. It was under Chinese occupation that the Mongolian People's Party was founded and once again looked to the north, this time to Soviet Russia, for help. In the meantime, White Russian troops led by Roman von Ungern-Sternberg had occupied Khuree in early March 1921, and a new theocratic government declared independence from China on 13 March. But the Mongolian Revolution of 1921 broke out and Ungern and the remaining Chinese troops were driven out in the following months, and on 6 July 1921, the Mongolian People's Party and Soviet troops took Niislel Khuree. The People's Party founded a new government, but kept the Bogd Khaan as nominal head of state. In the following years through some violent power struggles, Soviet influence got ever stronger, and after the Bogd Khaan's death, the Mongolian People's Republic was proclaimed on 26 November 1924. The government took control of the Bogda Khan's seal after his death according to the 26 November 1924 Constitution of the Mongolian People's Republic.

It was proposed that Zhang Zuolin's domain (the Chinese "Three Eastern Provinces") would take Outer Mongolia under its administration by the Bogda Khan and Bodo in 1922 after pro-Soviet Mongolian Communists seized control of Outer Mongolia.

Consolidation of power (1925–38) 

Between 1925 and 1928, the new regime became established. At the time, Mongolia was severely underdeveloped. Industry was nonexistent and all wealth was controlled by the nobility and religious establishments. The population numbered less than a million people and was shrinking due to nearly half of all Mongolian males living in monasteries. In 1928, Soviet leader Joseph Stalin and the Comintern ordered the collectivization of Mongolian agriculture. This led to an economic crisis, which resulted in uprisings in the West and the South. Led by lamas, rebels took control of four provinces in hopes of an intervention by revered Panchen Lama or support by the Japanese. Although surprised by the uprising's scale, the Soviet government quickly reacted to defend the Mongolian regime and sent goods as well as troops. Encircled by the Communist forces and bombed by the Soviet Air Forces, the rebel zones faced starvation, causing the rebels to resort to cannibalism before being defeated. The Politburo of the Communist Party of the Soviet Union consequently criticised the Mongolian Communists for implementing the collectivization in a similar way as in the Soviet Union, forcing the Mongolian government to shift to the so-called "New Course" and abandon the noncapitalist path, including collectivization, for the time being. Historian Stephen Kotkin argued that this was a "full reversal Stalin would not countenance at home", although collectivization had resulted in similar economic chaos and a great famine in the Soviet Union.

In 1934, Peljidiin Genden visited Moscow and angrily accused Stalin of "Red imperialism". He subsequently died in the Great Purge after being tricked into taking a holiday on the Black Sea. After 1932, the implementation of a command economy was scaled back. Meanwhile, Japanese incursions in Manchuria were a casus belli for Moscow to station troops in Mongolia. In 1936, Stalin then ordered the Great Purge into Mongolia. Among those killed were Genden, Anandyn Amar, Demid, and Darizavyn Losol. After the removal of Genden from power, Marshal Khorloogiin Choibalsan, a follower of Stalin, took over.

World War II (1939–1945) 

During World War II, because of a growing Japanese threat over the border between Mongolia and Manchuria, the Soviet Union reversed the course of Mongolian socialism in favor of a new policy of economic gradualism and build-up of the national defence. The Soviet and Mongolian armies defeated Japanese forces that had invaded eastern Mongolia in the summer of 1939 at the Battle of Khalkhin Gol, and a truce was signed setting up a commission to define the Mongolian-Manchurian border in the autumn of that year.

After 1941, Mongolia's economy was readjusted to support the Soviet Union in every way possible, including providing funding for several Soviet military units. Russian historian V. Suvorov wrote that Mongolian aid during the Soviet–German War was important like the United States assistance because warm clothes often decided victory in battles on the Eastern Front. Additionally, Mongolian volunteers fought in the Red Army against the Axis Powers in Europe.

In 1944, Mongolia lost one of its neighbors when the Tuvan People's Republic joined the Soviet Union.

In the summer of 1945, the Soviet Union used Mongolia as one base for launching the Manchurian Strategic Offensive Operation, a successful attack against the Japanese. The preceding build-up brought 650,000 Soviet soldiers to Mongolia, along with massive amounts of equipment. The Mongolian People's Army played a limited support role in the conflict, but its involvement gave Stalin the means to force the Chinese side finally to accept Mongolia's independence.

1945 Sino-Soviet Treaty and Mongolia's independence 

The February 1945 Yalta Conference provided for the Soviet Union's participation in the Pacific War. One of the Soviet conditions for its participation, put forward at Yalta, was that after the war Outer Mongolia would retain its "status quo". The precise meaning of this "status quo" became a bone of contention at Sino-Soviet talks in Moscow in the summer of 1945 between Stalin and Chiang Kai-shek's envoy T. V. Soong.

Stalin insisted on the Republic of China's recognition of Outer Mongolia's independence – something that it already enjoyed de facto even as it remained a part of China de jure. Chiang Kai-shek resisted the idea but eventually gave in. However, Chiang extracted from Stalin a promise to refrain from supporting the Chinese Communist Party, partly as a quid pro quo for giving up Outer Mongolia.

Thus, the Sino-Soviet Treaty guaranteed Outer Mongolia's independence, but it also ended Khorloogiin Choibalsan's hopes for uniting Outer Mongolia with Inner Mongolia, which remained in China's hands. Choibalsan initially hoped that Stalin would support his vision of Great Mongolia but the Soviet leader easily sacrificed Choibalsan's vision for Soviet gains, guaranteed by the Sino-Soviet Treaty and legitimized by the Yalta agreements. In this sense, the Sino-Soviet Treaty marked Mongolia's permanent division into an independent Mongolian People's Republic and a neighboring Inner Mongolia of the Republic of China.

Cold War politics (1945–1985)

Secure in its relations with Moscow, the Mongolian government shifted to postwar development, focusing on civilian enterprise. Mongolia was at this time one of the world's most isolated countries, having almost no contact with any nation outside of the Soviet Union. After the war, international ties were expanded and Mongolia established relations with North Korea and the new Communist states in Eastern Europe. Mongolia and the People's Republic of China (PRC) recognized each other in 1949, and the PRC relinquished all claims to Outer Mongolia. However, Mao Zedong privately hoped for Mongolia's reintegration with China. He raised this question before the Soviet leadership as early as 1949 (in meeting with Anastas Mikoyan at Xibaipo), and then, after having been firmly rebuffed by Stalin, again in 1954, a year after Stalin's death. In 1956, following Nikita Khrushchev's denunciation of Stalin, the Chinese leaders attempted to present Mongolia's independence as one of Stalin's mistakes in meetings with Mikoyan. The Soviet response was that the Mongols were free to decide their own fate.

In 1952, Choibalsan died in Moscow where he had been undergoing treatment for cancer. He was succeeded as Prime Minister by Yumjaagiin Tsedenbal. Unlike his predecessor, Tsedenbal was enthusiastic about incorporating Mongolia as a constituent republic of the Soviet Union. The idea met with strenuous opposition from other MPRP members and was subsequently abandoned.

In the 1950s relations between the MPR and the PRC improved considerably. China provided much needed economic aid, building up entire industries in Ulaanbaatar, as well as apartment blocks. Thousands of Chinese laborers were involved in these projects until China withdrew them after 1962 in a bid to pressure Mongolia to break with Moscow at the time of worsening Sino-Soviet relations.

After the beginning of the Sino-Soviet split, Mongolia briefly vacillated, but soon took a sharply pro-Soviet stand, being one of the first socialist countries to endorse the Soviet position in the quarrel with China. Military build-up on the Sino-Mongolian border began as early as 1963; in December 1965 the Mongolian Politburo requested the Soviet Union to station its military forces in Mongolia. In January 1966, with Leonid Brezhnev's visit to Mongolia, the two countries signed a mutual assistance treaty, paving the way to Soviet military presence in the MPR. In February 1967, following weeks of worsening Sino-Soviet tensions, Moscow officially approved the stationing of the reorganised 39th Soviet Army in Mongolia.

With Soviet encouragement, Mongolia increased its participation in communist-sponsored conferences and international organizations. In 1955, Mongolia attempted to join the United Nations, but the request was vetoed by the Republic of China (now based in Taiwan) which maintained its renewed claim over Mongolia. Mongolia became a member of the UN in 1961 after the Soviet Union threatened to veto the admission of all of the newly decolonized states of Africa if the Republic of China again used its veto. Diplomatic relations with the United States were not established until near the end of the Cold War. Mongolia became a bone of contention between the Soviet Union and China following the Sino-Soviet split because of the presence of Soviet nuclear arms.

By the beginning of the 1980s, Tsedenbal became increasingly authoritarian and erratic. Following a series of party purges, he was expelled from office in August 1984 on the pretext of "old age and mental incapacity". The removal of Tsedenbal had full Soviet backing, and he retired to Moscow where he lived until his death from cancer in 1991. Jambyn Batmönkh took over as General Secretary and enthusiastically plunged into the reforms implemented in the Soviet Union by Mikhail Gorbachev.

Transition (1985–1992) 

After Mikhail Gorbachev came to power in the Soviet Union, he implemented the policies of perestroika and glasnost. The atmosphere of reform in the Soviet Union prompted similar reforms in Mongolia. Following mass demonstrations in the winter of 1990, the MPRP began to loosen its controls of the political system. The Politburo of the MPRP resigned in March, and in May the constitution was amended, deleting reference to the MPRP's role as the guiding force in the country, legalizing opposition parties, creating a standing legislative body, and establishing the office of president. On 29 July 1990, the first multiparty elections in Mongolia were held. The election results returned a majority for the MPRP, which won with 85% of the vote.  It was not until 1996 that the reformed MPRP was voted out of office.

The Soviet Union withdrew its troops stationed in Mongolia, and its technical and financial assistance, between 1987 and 1992. Subsequently, the foreign and defense policy of Mongolia profoundly changed: "Maintaining friendly relations with the Russian Federation and the People's Republic of China shall be a priority of Mongolia's foreign policy activity. It shall not adopt the line of either country but shall maintain in principle a balanced relationship with both of them and shall promote all-round good neighborly co-operation."

Law 

The legal framework was set by the constitution until 1941. Successively there were three versions originating from 1924, 1940 and 1960, respectively.

Economy 

On the eve of the 1921 revolution, Mongolia had an underdeveloped, stagnant economy based on nomadic animal husbandry. Farming and industry were almost nonexistent; transportation and communications were primitive; banking, services, and trade were almost exclusively in the hands of Chinese or other foreigners. Most of the people were illiterate nomadic herders, and a large part of the male labour force lived in the monasteries, contributing little to the economy. Property in the form of livestock was owned primarily by aristocrats and monasteries; ownership of the remaining sectors of the economy was dominated by Chinese or other foreigners. Mongolia's new rulers thus were faced with a daunting task in building a modern, socialist economy.

Mongolia's economic development under the communist government can be divided into three periods: 1921–1939; 1940–1960; and 1961 to the present. During the first period, which the People's Republic called the stage of "general democratic transformation," the economy remained primarily agrarian and underdeveloped. After an abortive attempt to collectivize herders, livestock remained in private hands. The state began to develop industry based on processing of animal husbandry products and crop raising on state farms. Transportation, communications, domestic and foreign trade, and banking and finance were nationalized with Soviet assistance; they were placed under the control of Mongolian state and cooperative organizations or Mongolian-Soviet joint-stock companies. Ulaanbaatar became the nation's industrial center.

During the second period, called the "construction of the foundations of socialism," agriculture was collectivized, and industry was diversified into mining, timber processing, and consumer goods production. Central planning of the economy began in 1931 with an abortive five-year plan and with annual plans in 1941; five-year plans began anew with the First Five-Year Plan (1948–52). Soviet, and after 1949 Chinese, aid increased, allowing the construction of the Trans-Mongolian Railway – the Ulaanbaatar Railway – and various industrial projects. Although industrial development still was concentrated in Ulaanbaatar, economic decentralization began with the completion of the Ulaanbaatar Railroad and the establishment of food processing plants in aimag centers.

The third stage, which the government called the "completion of the construction of the material and technical basis of socialism," saw further industrialization and agricultural growth, aided largely by Mongolia's joining the Council for Mutual Economic Assistance (Comecon) in 1962. After the Sino-Soviet split, Chinese aid ceased, but continued Soviet and East European financial and technical assistance in the forms of credits, advisers, and joint ventures enabled Mongolia to modernize and to diversify industry, particularly in mining. New industrial centers were built in Baganuur, Choibalsan, Darkhan, and Erdenet, and industrial output rose significantly. Although animal husbandry was stagnant, crop production increased dramatically with the development of virgin lands by state farms. Foreign trade with Comecon nations grew substantially. Transportation and communications systems were improved, linking population and industrial centers and extending to more remote rural areas. In the late 1980s, Mongolia had developed into an agricultural-industrial economy, but the shortcomings of the Mongolian economy and the example of perestroika in the Soviet Union led Mongolian leaders to undertake a reform program to develop the economy further in a more capitalistic direction.

Industry accounted for 7 percent of Mongolia's Net Material Product (NMP) in 1950, but for 35 percent of the total by 1985, and trade increased from 10 percent in 1950 to 26 percent by 1985. Agriculture, including herding, which accounted for 68 percent of NMP in 1950, had declined to 20 percent by 1985. In 1960, 61 percent of the employed worked in the agricultural sector, but by 1985 only 33 percent earned their livelihoods in that sector. GDP figures for Mongolia record growth throughout the 1980s. As late as 1988, the annual increase in GDP amounted to 5.1 percent.

Health system 

Before the 1920's Mongolia had no medical services aside from what was provided by the Lama's. Healthcare in Mongolia was developed from 1922 under the Soviet Semashko model with a large hospital and clinical network. This needed a large supply of clinically trained staff, which was not forthcoming. The isolation of the country meant that developments in medicine were slow to reach it. The ratio of doctors to the general population increased dramatically, so that in 1990, there were more than 6,000 physicians, three-quarters of whom were women. The medical care system was accessible at little or no cost even in the most remote areas. State-sponsored maternity rest homes for pastoral women in the last stages of pregnancy helped to lower infant mortality from 109 per 1,000 live births in 1960 to 57.4 in 1990, and maternal mortality by about 25 percent from 1960 to 1990.

Mongolian People's Army 

 

The Mongolian People's Army (Mongolian: Монголын Ардын Арми, or Монгол Ардын Хувьсгалт Цэрэг) or Mongolian People's Revolutionary Army was established on 18 March 1921 as a secondary army under Soviet Red Army command during the 1920s and during World War II.

During the Pei-ta-shan Incident, elite Qinghai Chinese Muslim cavalry were sent by the Chinese government to destroy the Mongols and the Russians in 1947.

The military of Mongolia's purpose was national defense, protection of local communist establishments, and collaboration with Soviet forces in future military actions against exterior enemies, up until the 1990 Democratic Revolution in Mongolia.

The Red Mongol Army received sixty percent of the government budget in early years and it expanded from 2,560 men in 1923 to 4,000 in 1924 and to 7,000 in 1927. The native armed forces stayed linked to Soviet Red Army intelligence groups and NKVD. Mongolian secret police, and Buryat Mongol Comintern agents acted as administrators and represented the real power in the country albeit under direct Soviet guidance.

See also 

 Economy of the Mongolian People's Republic
 History of modern Mongolia
 Mongolian People's Army
 Mengjiang
 Tuvan People's Republic
 List of socialist countries
 Politics of Mongolia

Notes

References

Works cited

Further reading
 Jianyong, Feng. "The 1911 Revolution and the Frontier: The  'Political Game' and 'State-Building' in Outer Mongolia during the 1911 Revolution 辛亥革命とフロンティア 外モンゴルにおける政治のゲームと国家建設." (2014).   Online

External links 

 History of the Mongolian People's Republic, a joint 1973 Soviet-Mongolian work published in English.
 By-Passing Capitalism, a 1968 Mongolian work published in English.

 
Mongolian People's Republic
Mongol states
Mongolia
States and territories established in 1924
States and territories disestablished in 1992
1924 establishments in Mongolia
1992 disestablishments in Asia
20th-century disestablishments in Mongolia
20th century in Mongolia
Former socialist republics
Communist states
Totalitarian states